Orion is a locality in the Central Highlands Region, Queensland, Australia.

Geography 
The Dawson Highway passes through the south-west of the locality. The eastern and central parts of the locality are about 200 metres about sea level while the western part of the locality is more mountainous rising to unnamed peaks of 600 metres. The predominant land use is grain growing.

History 
Orion State School opened on 28 January 1964.

Education 
Orion State School is a primary (P-6) school for boys and girls operated by the Queensland Government at 1002 Ten Chain Road. In 2016, the school had an enrolment of 16 students with 1 teacher and 4 non-teaching staff (2 full-time equivalent).

References 

Central Highlands Region
Localities in Queensland